Amel Mujčinović (born 20 November 1973) is a retired Bosnian-Herzegovinian football goalkeeper.

International career
He was capped once for Bosnia and Herzegovina, appearing as a second-half substitute for Adnan Gušo in a friendly match against Hungary in 2001.

References

External links
Player profile at NZS 

1973 births
Living people
Sportspeople from Tuzla
Association football goalkeepers
Bosnia and Herzegovina footballers
Bosnia and Herzegovina international footballers
NK Celje players
FC Anzhi Makhachkala players
NK Mura players
Slovenian PrvaLiga players
Russian Premier League players
Russian First League players
Bosnia and Herzegovina expatriate footballers
Expatriate footballers in Slovenia
Bosnia and Herzegovina expatriate sportspeople in Slovenia
Expatriate footballers in Russia
Bosnia and Herzegovina expatriate sportspeople in Russia